Unquestionable Presence is the second album by the death metal band Atheist. It was released in 1991 and added a new sound by using jazz-like harmonies, subtle Latin rhythms and unusual time signatures.

Content
It is considered a landmark album in the genre of technical death metal.

Bassist Roger Patterson wrote the bass lines for Unquestionable Presence, but died in a touring van accident before the recording sessions took place. His work, however, can be heard on the pre-production demos included with the 2005 re-release. Tony Choy was brought in as a replacement to play bass on the album.

Critical reception

James Hinchcliffe described the album in Terrorizer as "the very pinnacle of scorching yet brain-twisting technical metal". Phil Freeman in The Wire (issue 261, p. 53) described Unquestionable Presence as a "more complex and progressive album, every song rocketing through multiple tricky time signatures and endless variations on already baffling riffs." In October 2005, Unquestionable Presence was inducted into the Decibel Magazine Hall of Fame being the ninth album overall to be featured in the Decibel Hall of Fame.

Track listing
All lyrics by Kelly Shaefer.  All music composed by Atheist.

2005 re-release
In 2005, Relapse Records re-released Unquestionable Presence. This edition has been digitally remastered, and features nine bonus tracks.

Personnel
 Kelly Shaefer – vocals, rhythm guitar
 Rand Burkey – lead guitar
 Tony Choy –  bass
 Steve Flynn –  drums
 Roger Patterson –  bass (on tracks 9–15 on 2005 re-release)
 Scott Burns – production
 Atheist – production
 Justice Mitchell – cover artwork

References

1991 albums
Atheist (band) albums
Active Records albums
Relapse Records albums
Albums produced by Scott Burns (record producer)
Albums recorded at Morrisound Recording
Jazz fusion albums
Technical death metal albums
Progressive metal albums